USS LST-371 was a  used by the United States Navy.

She was laid down at Bethlehem Steel Co., Quincy, Massachusetts, on 29 October 1942 and launched on 12 December 1942.  The ship and crew went from Quincy to New York City, New York for final outfitting.  On 1 May 1943 they left New York for Tunis, Tunisia, on the North African coast, arriving there on 27 May 1943.  While in North Africa LST-371 was based at La Goulette Bay.

Wartime career
LST-371 participated in Operation Husky, the invasion of Sicily, on 10 July 1943, landing troops of the First Division at Gela.  During Operation Avalanche, the ship arrived at Salerno on 9 September 1943 and landed British troops early on the morning of 10 September 1943.

On 22 November 1943, LST-371 departed Oran, Algeria loaded with a LCT to convoy from Gibraltar to the British Isles.  They arrived at Plymouth, England, on 5 December 1944.  For the rest of the winter and spring they prepared for Operation Overlord, the invasion of Normandy, France.

The ship departed her home port of Dartmouth, England, on the night of 5 June 1944 and arrived at Normandy on 6 June 1944.   They unloaded on Rhino Ferries and LCTs on 7 June 1944.  During the next several months they made numerous trips between Normandy, Portland, and Southampton.

LST-371 was decommissioned from the U.S. Navy and transferred to the Royal Navy on 17 November 1944.  On 16 March 1946 the ship was transferred back to the U.S. Navy and on 5 December 1947 she was sold to Bosey, Philippines.  LST-371 earned three battle stars for World War II service

References
 Diary of Robert R. Tavenner, MoMM2, LST-371
 
 

 

LST-1-class tank landing ships of the United States Navy
Ships built in Quincy, Massachusetts
1942 ships
World War II amphibious warfare vessels of the United States
LST-1-class tank landing ships of the Royal Navy
World War II amphibious warfare vessels of the United Kingdom